King Khalid University is a public university in Abha, Saudi Arabia. In 1998, HRH Crown Prince ordered the merger of Imam Mohammad Ibn Saud Islamic University and King Saud University in the Southern Region into one entity under the new identity of 'King Khalid University'.

History

1998 creation as a merger
King Khalid University was established in 1998 under the tutelage of the late King Fahd bin Abdulaziz Al Saud. The university commenced operations with four colleges:
 College of Sharia and Fundamentals of Religion;
 College of Arabic Language;
 College of Social and Administrative Sciences;
 College of Education.

Over the years, new colleges were incorporated including female colleges. , there are 29 colleges encompassing many disciplines such as engineering, computer science, and medicine. King Khalid University was needed based on the growing population of the southern region. Previously, higher education students had to attend satellite campuses of other Saudi universities. , King Khalid University serves approximately 60,000 students.

King Khalid University was recently ranked fourth in overall performance among universities in Saudi Arabia. In the MENA region, King Khalid University was ranked 24th in overall performance in 2019 by Quacquarelli Symonds (QS).  At the international level, King Khalid University was recently ranked 448th in QS World University Rankings. As part of the strategic plan, the university objective is to increase its ranking to the top 200 by 2030.

2012 student protests and change of university presidency

On 7 March 2012, during the 2011–2012 Saudi Arabian protests, women students of the University protested against "injustice and inequality" and "discrimination and mistreatment" by university security staff. The students were attacked by security forces and on 10 March held a sit-in calling for the rector Abdullah al-Rashid to resign. On 1 July 2012, Rashid was fired by King Abdullah and replaced by Abdulrahman al-Dawood.

Organisational structure

Leadership

Presidency
Abdullah al-Rashid was the elected or appointed president of King Khalid University until 1 July 2012, during the 2011–12 Saudi Arabian protests, when he was replaced by Abdulrahman al-Dawood following massive student protests in May and calls for his resignation. , Faleh al-Solami was the president of the university.

Deans
Deans who are elected or appointed include those of the:
 Deanship of Faculty Members and Teaching Staff 
 Deanship of Students Affairs   
 e-Learning Deanship
 Deanship of Graduate Studies
 Community Service and Continuing Education Deanship
 Scientific Research Deanship
 Deanship of Library Affairs
 Academic Development and Quality Deanship  
 Admission and Registration Deanship
 Institute of Research and Consulting Studies
 Dean of the Women's College, Shanaifa al-Qarni

Administration
  General Administration of Administrative and Financial Affairs
  General Administration of Information Technology
  Administration of Studies and Information
  Scholarship Administration

Colleges and departments
 
Sharia and Fundamentals of Religion College
 1.1. Undergraduate Programs: 
 1.1.1 Sharia Program (Bachelor) 
 1.1.2 Fundamentals of Religion (Bachelor) 
 1.2. Postgraduate Programs:
 1.2.1. Quranic Sciences (Master and Ph.D.).
 1.2.2. Sunnah (Sayings and Teachings of Prophet Muhammad) and its Sciences (Master and Ph.D.).
 1.2.3. Creed and Contemporary Doctrines (Master and Ph.D.).
 1.2.4. Jurisprudence (Master and Ph.D.)
 1.2.5. Fundamentals of Jurisprudence (Master and Ph.D.)
 1.2.6. Systems (Master and Ph.D.).

Computer Science College
 2.1. Undergraduate Programs: 
 2.1.1. Computer Science (Bachelor) 
 2.1.2. Information System (Bachelor) 
 2.1.3. Computer Engineering (Bachelor) 
 2.1.4. Computer Networks and Communications Engineering (Bachelor) 
 2.2. Postgraduate Programs:
 2.2.1. Information System (Master) 
 2.2.2. Computer Engineering (Master)
 
Education College
 3.1. Undergraduate Programs: 
 3.1.1. General Education (Diploma)
 3.1.2. Psychological Guidance and Counseling (Diploma)
 3.1.3. Special Education (Bachelor) 
 3.1.4. Visual Impairment (Bachelor) 
 3.1.5. Learning Difficulties (Bachelor) 
 3.1.6. Special Education and Disability (Bachelor) 
 3.1.7. Primary Education (Bachelor) 
 3.1.8. Islamic Studies (Bachelor) 
 3.1.9. Arabic Language (Bachelor)  
 3.1.10. Mathematics (Bachelor) 
 3.1.11. Science (Bachelor) 
 3.2. Postgraduate Programs:
 3.2.1. Curriculum and General Teaching Methods (Master and Ph.D.).
 3.2.2. Curriculum and Science Teaching Methods (Master and Ph.D.).
 3.2.3. Administration and Educational Supervision (Master and Ph.D.).
 3.2.4. Fundamentals of Islamic Education (Master and Ph.D.).
 3.2.5. Guidance and Counseling (Master and Ph.D.).

Humanities College
 4.1. Undergraduate Programs: 
 4.1.1. History (Bachelor) 
 4.1.2. Geography (Bachelor) 
 4.1.3. Arabic Language (Bachelor) 
 4.1.4. Radio and Television (Bachelor) 
 4.1.5. Media and Communication (Bachelor) 
 4.1.6. Strategic Communication (Bachelor) 
 4.1.7. Journalism and Electronic Editing (Bachelor) 
 4.2. Postgraduate Programs:
 4.2.1. Arabic Language and Literature (Master)
 4.2.2. Arabic Language and Linguistics (Master)
 4.2.3. History (Master) 
 4.2.4. Geography (Master)
 
Engineering College
 5.1. Undergraduate Programs: 
 5.1.1. Mechanical Engineering (Bachelor) 
 5.1.2. Electrical Engineering (Bachelor) 
 5.1.3. Civil Engineering (Bachelor) 
 5.1.4. Chemical Engineering (Bachelor) 
 5.1.5. Industrial Engineering (Bachelor) 
 5.1.6. Architecture and Planning (Bachelor)
 
College of Business
 6.1. Undergraduate Programs:  
 6.1.1. Business Administration (Bachelor)  
 6.1.2. Accounting (Bachelor)  
 6.1.3. Administrative Information System (Bachelor)  
 6.1.4. Law (Bachelor)  
 6.1.6. E-Commerce and Marketing (Bachelor)  
 6.2. Postgraduate Programs: 
 6.2.1. Executive Business Administration (Master)  
 6.2.2. Accounting (Master)  
 6.2.3. Professional Accounting (Master)
 
Science College
 7.1. Undergraduate Programs: 
 7.1.1 Biology (Bachelor) 
 7.1.2 Mathematics (Bachelor) 
 7.1.3 Physics (Bachelor) 
 7.1.4 Chemistry (Bachelor) 
 7.2. Postgraduate Programs:
 7.2.1. Physics (Master) 
 7.2.2 Chemistry (Master)
 
Languages and Translation College
 8.1. Undergraduate Programs:  
 8.1.1. English Language (Bachelor)  
 8.2. Postgraduate Programs:            
 8.2.1. Translation (Master)  
 8.2.2. Applied Linguistics (Master)

Medicine College
 9.1. Undergraduate Programs:  
 9.1.1. Physiology (Bachelor)  
 9.1.2. Anatomy Department (Bachelor)  
 9.1.3. Clinical Microbiology and Parasitology (Bachelor)  
 9.1.4. Pathology (Bachelor)  
 9.1.5. Family and Community Medicine (Bachelor)  
 9.1.6. Internal Medicine (Bachelor)  
 9.1.7. Obstetrics and Gynecology (Bachelor)  
 9.1.8. Pediatrics (Bachelor)  
 9.1.9. Surgery (Bachelor)  
 9.1.10. Medical Education (Bachelor)  
 9.1.11. Clinical Biochemistry (Bachelor)

Dentistry college
 10.1. Undergraduate Programs: 
 10.1.1. Oral and Maxillofacial Surgery (Bachelor) 
 10.1.2. Periodontics and Community Dentistry (Bachelor) 
 10.1.3. Diagnostic Dental Sciences (Bachelor) 
 10.1.4. Prosthetic Dental Sciences (Bachelor) 
 10.1.5. Restorative Dental Sciences (Bachelor) 
 10.1.6. Pediatric Dentistry and Orthodontics Science (Bachelor) 
 10.1.7. Dental Education (Bachelor)
 
Pharmacy College
 11.1. Undergraduate Programs: 
 11.1.2. Pharmaceutics (Bachelor) 
 11.1.2. Clinical pharmacy (Bachelor) 
 11.1.3. Pharmacology (Bachelor) 
 11.1.4. Pharmacognosy (Bachelor) 
 11.1.5. Pharmaceutical Chemistry (Bachelor)
 
Applied Medical Sciences College
 12.1. Undergraduate Programs: 
 12.1.1. Medical Rehabilitation Sciences (Bachelor) 
 12.1.2. Radiological Science (Bachelor)                                                            
 12.1.3. Clinical Laboratory Sciences (Bachelor) 
 12.1.4. Dental Technology (Bachelor) 
 12.4.5 Anesthesia Technology (Bachelor) 
 12.4.6 Emergency Medical Services (Bachelor) 
 12.4.7 Public Health (Bachelor) 
 12.4.8 General Nursing (Bachelor)

Research Centers
 King Khalid Chair for Scientific Research
 Al Jazirah Newspaper Chair
 Media Center
 Administrative Leaders Preparation Center
 Center of Research and Social Studies
 Prince Sultan bin Abdul Alziz Center for Research and Environmental Studies and Tourism
 Center for  Talent and Creativity
 Center of Linguistic Research
 Center of Governing Companies
 Knowledge Entrepreneurship Center
 Tahawol Center
 Center for Documentation Archiving
 Research Science Center for Advanced Materials

Associations
 Saudi Association for Statistical Sciences
 Saudi Society for Medical Education

Location
 
Since its inception, the goal was to have King Khalid University operate at a single central location. This was impractical at the outset due to the size of the project and the massive infrastructure requirements. Initially, the university occupied buildings in many different locations. In 2011–12, the university completed construction of the Guraiger Campus in Abha. This has served and continues to serve as the main campus for all educational and administration. A female campus was built in al-Fara. There are still a few satellite campuses that can operate with a great deal of independence. However, the goal of a single fully integrated facility remains and is in progress.
 
, a standalone campus for King Khalid University was under construction in al-Fara. This new campus is commonly known as University City. As part of the medical college, plans were made to build a public hospital which would have one of the largest bed capacities in the Middle East. Because of the scope of the construction project, there were many international bidders for the contract. The university, in cooperation with the King Abdullah Institute for Research and Studies and King Saud University, organized a global competitive bidding program for the design, planning, and construction of University City. As one of the most prominent higher education infrastructure projects in the Kingdom, the competition attracted 28 regional, national, and international bidders. To qualify for the bidding process, each company had to prove its capabilities in large scale construction. The infrastructure at University City is substantial. There are two major service buildings that provide electromechanical components and utilities to all the other buildings on the campus.
 
Construction of University City is being done in seven phases over a period of years, which are:
 
 Phase 1 – Arts and Sciences Academic Complex;
 Phase 2 – Medical Complex with an 800-bed hospital;
 Phase 3 – Administrative Facilities;
 Phase 4 –  Roads and Utility Infrastructure;
 Phase 5 – Sports Complex;
 Phase 6 – Faculty Housing;
 Phase 7 – Student Housing.
 
The construction project is under the auspices of the University Vice Presidency of Projects. Day-to-day supervision is provided by a variety of consultants, sub-contractors, and engineers representing various private firms from across the globe. King Khalid University Rector, Falleh al-Solamy, took an active leadership role in overseeing the development of the project. In addition, Governor of the Asir region, Turki bin Talal bin Abdul Aziz Al Saud, "took keen interest" in University City. The construction project was considered to be a major asset and investment in the southern region.

References

 
1998 establishments in Saudi Arabia
Universities and colleges in Saudi Arabia
Educational institutions established in 1998